Agamura is a genus of geckos.

Species
Three Agamura species are recognized:
Agamura cruralis 
Agamura kermanensis 
Agamura persica  – Persian spider gecko

Geckos of the genus Rhinogekko have sometimes been classified in genus Agamura but the genus is currently considered distinct from the latter. These genera share a number of characteristics: straight to slightly bent toes, weakly tuberculate skin, and long, thin limbs and tail.

References

 
Lizard genera
Taxa named by William Thomas Blanford